Rockingham is an electoral district of the Legislative Assembly in the Australian state of Western Australia.

The district is located in the outer south-western suburbs of Perth.

Rockingham has been held at all times by the Labor Party, and currently is held by Mark McGowan, the Premier of Western Australia.

Geography
The electorate is a compact, urban district centred on the coastal community of Rockingham, a satellite suburb to the south-west of Perth. The district also takes in the neighbouring suburbs of Peron, Shoalwater, Safety Bay, as well as parts of Cooloongup, East Rockingham and Waikiki. The district also includes Garden Island.

The seat was created in 1974 at the height of the Charles Court government's popularity, and was initially a marginal Labor seat. However, a redistribution ahead of the 1980 election made it much friendlier to Labor, and since then it has been one of Labor's safest seats. Since 1980, Labor's hold on the seat has only been seriously threatened twice, in 1989 and 1993.

Members for Rockingham
Rockingham has had only two members. The first, Mike Barnett, served as Speaker of the Legislative Assembly for most of the Burke and Dowding governments. He retired in 1996 and handed the seat to Mark McGowan, a minister in the Gallop and Carpenter governments, and later a prominent member of the opposition to the Barnett government. 

McGowan was elected leader of WA Labor, and hence Leader of the Opposition, in 2012. As a measure of Labor's strength in the seat, McGowan picked up a modest swing in his favour in 2013 even as Labor was heavily defeated statewide.

Four years later, McGowan led Labor to the largest majority government in the state's history. Along the way, his own margin in Rockingham swelled from an already comfortably safe 13.2 percent to 23.4 percent. In 2021, he led Labor to the most comprehensive election victory at any level in Australia since Federation, with 53 out of 59 seats. His own margin in Rockingham ballooned to 37.7 percent, the safest seat in the state.

Election results

References

External links
 WAEC district maps: current boundaries, previous distributions

Electoral districts of Western Australia
Electoral district
1974 establishments in Australia
Constituencies established in 1974